Lacson is a surname. It is from the Hokkien "la̍k-sun". "Lacson" was spelled as Laxon and Laczon by the Spaniards, depending on where they came from in Spain. Notable people with the surname include:

Alex Lacson (born 1965), Filipino bestselling author, reform advocate, lawyer, and former Senatorial candidate
Aniceto Lacson (1857–1931), sugar farmer, revolutionary general and businessman in the Philippines
Arsenio Lacson (1911–1962), Filipino journalist and politician, Mayor of Manila from 1952 to 1962
Eugenio Jose Lacson (born 1959), Filipino politician and current governor of Negros Occidental
Panfilo Lacson (born 1948), Filipino Senator and former Director-General of the Philippine National Police

See also
Lacson Avenue, a major thoroughfare in Manila, Philippines
John B. Lacson Colleges Foundation-Bacolod, Inc., private maritime college in Bacolod City, Negros Occidental, Philippines

Hokkien-language surnames